The men's 800 metres event at the 2010 World Junior Championships in Athletics was held in Moncton, New Brunswick, Canada, at Moncton Stadium on 23, 24 and 25 July.

Medalists

Results

Final
25 July

Semifinals
24 July

Semifinal 1

Semifinal 2

Semifinal 3

Heats
23 July

Heat 1

Heat 2

Heat 3

Heat 4

Heat 5

Heat 6

Participation
According to an unofficial count, 47 athletes from 37 countries participated in the event.

References

800 metres
800 metres at the World Athletics U20 Championships